Cyana hamata is a moth of the family Erebidae first described by Francis Walker in 1854. It is found in Japan, China, Taiwan, Korea and Thailand.

The wingspan is 26–34 mm. Adults are on wing in February and September.

References

Moths described in 1854
Cyana
Moths of Japan